Sahil Raj (born 7 September 2003) is an Indian cricketer. He made his first-class debut on 27 January 2020, for Jharkhand in the 2019–20 Ranji Trophy.

References

External links
 

2003 births
Living people
Indian cricketers
Jharkhand cricketers
Place of birth missing (living people)